Forjando un Ídolo (Spanish for "Forging an idol") was a professional wrestling tournament held by Mexican professional wrestling promotion Consejo Mundial de Lucha Libre (CMLL) in 2011 with the purpose of identifying which of the 16 "Rookies" in the tournament would move up the ranks of the promotion. The tournament consisted of two rounds, first a round robin group round, with the top 2 in each of the four groups competing in an elimination tournament. Wrestlers would earn points based on match results and points from a weekly online poll. The tournament ran from April 11 until May 20, 2012 and saw Ángel de Oro win the tournament. The top two from each group would team up with their mentor for a trios tournament called Forjando un Ídolo: La Guerra Continúa ("Forging an Idol: The war continues"), won by Atlantis, Guerrero Maya Jr. and Delta.

Background
The event featured sixteen professional wrestlers or luchadors, some of whom were tecnicos (the Lucha Libre term for someone who portrays a "good guy" character) and some who were rudos ("Bad Guys"). Being a professional wrestling tournament, the matches were not won legitimately through athletic competition; it is instead won via predetermined outcomes to the matches that is kept secret from the general public.

Tournament
The tournament was divided into two rounds, in the first round wrestlers were divided into groups of four for a round-robin style tournament where a wrestler scores points for winning matches or draws. A wrestler would earn 3 points for a victory, 1 point in case of a draw. each week of the first round one additional point would be awarded based on an online poll. Each group was also assigned a "Coach", an experienced wrestler with the storyline being that they were actually training everyone in their group between events. The four groups were

Grupo Alfa
Diamante
Hijo del Signo
Hombre Bala Jr.
Puma King
Coach: Negro Casas
Grupo Bravo
Ángel de Oro
Palacio Negro
Rey Cometa
Rey Escorpión
Coach: Último Guerrero
Grupo Charly
Delta
Dragon Lee
Guerrero Maya Jr.
Metal Blanco
Coach: Shocker
Grupo Delta
Ángel de Plata
Fuego
Magnus
Pólvora
Coach: Blue Panther

Metal Blanco received an extra point from the online polls in the first week (April 11 - April 18), Guerrero Maya Jr. received an extra point in the second week (April 18 - April 25) and Rey Escorpión received the extra point in the third week of voting (April 25 - May 2). Due to both Metal Blanco and Guerrero Maya. Jr. receiving an extra point they were tied for second in Grupo Charly and had to face off in a decision match, which saw Guerrero Maya Jr. earn the right to advance to the second round. The second round of the tournament was a single elimination tournament, which saw eight wrestlers face off, in the end Ángel de Oro defeated Pólvora to win the tournament.

Tournament Overview

Playoffs

Forjando un Ídolo: La Guerra Continúa
CMLL kept the Forjando un Ídolo concept going with a four team Trios tournament, which saw the coach of each group team up with the two finalist for the groups. Like the original Forjando un Ídolo tournament it would start with a Round-Robin tournament with the top two point earners meeting in the finale. Shocker, the coach for Groupo Charly was injured at the time and had to be replaced with Atlantis, with Shocker still accompanying them to the ring. In the finals Groupo Charly (Atlantis, Guerrero Maya Jr. and Delta) defeated Grupo Bravo (Negro Casas, Diamante and Hijo del Signo).

Trios tournament brackets

Aftermath
After the tournament was over CMLL offered Ángel de Oro the opportunity to use the Místico mask and name that had been vacated when the original Místico left to work as Sin Cara in WWE. Ángel de Oro turned the offer down for unknown reasons, causing CMLL to give the mask and ring character to Dragon Lee instead, who made his debut as Místico La Nueva Era ("The New Era") in June, 2012.

On November 16, Atlantis announced that he was officially forming a stable named Los Reyes de la Atlantida ("The Kings of Atlantis") with Delta and Guerrero Maya Jr. During the press conference to announce the new group the announcement was interrupted by Shocker, angry that his team had turned to Atlantis instead of him and introduced his own trio, consisting of himself and two new characters Titán (formerly Palacio Negro) and Tritón (formerly Metal Blanco). The storyline with Los Reyes was dropped only a few weeks later when Shocker was taken off the shows for personal reasons. On December 16, Los Reyes de la Atlantida defeated Los Invasores (Olímpico, Psicosis II and Volador Jr.) to win the Mexican National Trios Championship at CMLL's Sin Piedad show.

References

External links

2011 in professional wrestling
Lucha libre
Consejo Mundial de Lucha Libre tournaments
Events in Mexico City